Acts of Love is an album of 50 poems by Penny Rimbaud of the anarchist punk band Crass, set to classical music composed and arranged by Penny Rimbaud and Paul Ellis, and performed by Steve Ignorant and Eve Libertine. Released in 1985 on Crass Records, the record was accompanied by a book of 50 paintings by artist Gee Vaucher.

In 2012, the album was rereleased on CD.

References

1985 debut albums
Penny Rimbaud albums
Crass Records albums